Senator Kopp may refer to:

Mike Kopp (born 1969), Colorado State Senate
Quentin L. Kopp (born 1928), California State Senate